The Wrocław tram system is the tram system in Wrocław, Poland. 

Having first opened for service on 10 July 1877 with horsecars, it is the third oldest tramway in Poland (after Warsaw and Szczecin). The system uses .
and is operated by Miejskie Przedsiębiorstwo Komunikacyjne we Wrocławiu (MPK Wrocław).

Network

Below is a table of permanent routes as of the 6 June 2022 schedule:

There are plans for future lines to the Popowice and Maślice districts. The 3.8 km Popowice segment is planned to follow the Długa, Starogroblowa and Popowicka streets. The Maślicka line will start at the Municipal Stadium (Stadion Miejski) and continue to the intersection of Maślicka street with Główna and Królewiecka.

Rolling stock
Currently 7 types of trams are operating in Wrocław: Konstal 105Na, Protram 204 WrAs, Protram 205 WrAs, Škoda 16 T, Škoda 19 T, Pesa Twist and Moderus Beta. The 105N type wagons are subjected to various upgrades (and after the upgrade they are marked 105NWr).

In the period from 1991–2004, no new trams were bought; only repairs and upgrades of models Konstal 105N and Konstal 105Na were performed. During 2005–2008, six 2-wagon Protram 204 WrAs and ten low-floor Protram 205 WrAs vehicles were bought, all produced by RMT Protram Wrocław. From December 2006 to November 2007, seventeen low-floor wagons Škoda 16 T were acquired.

Notes

References

External links

Wrocław
Transport in Wrocław
Wrocław